St Lawrence for Pegwell Bay railway station was a railway station at Ramsgate, Kent, United Kingdom that was opened by the South Eastern Railway in 1864 and closed in 1916.

History
In July 1863, the company had opened a  spur (known as the St. Lawrence spur) to allow through running to Margate by avoiding the need to reverse at Ramsgate Town, a cramped and inconvenient station from which the line branched off to Margate at the very platform ends. In the event, the spur was little used by regular services. The building of the spur may be seen as a reaction to the arrival of a new competitor in the area, in the shape of the London, Chatham and Dover Railway (LCDR); the SER now felt the need to improve their services in the area, whereas for years operating as a monopoly they had not. Another major improvement completed in 1863 was the double-tracking of its route to Margate via Westwood. 

Principally to cater for the very occasional train avoiding Ramsgate, a station was opened to the west of the spur by the Newington Road Bridge (now the B2014). The station opened in October 1864 and was named St Lawrence (Pegwell Bay) after nearby St Lawrence village which was swallowed up in the suburbs of Ramsgate in the early 20th century. The station was also shown as St Lawrence for Pegwell Bay in some timetables, and on the station nameboards, highlighting the proximity of Pegwell Bay. The two facing platforms were to the west of the bridge, while the station building was to the east. Offices were constructed in the two arches either side of the tracks.

From 1 January 1899, the station was operated by the South Eastern and Chatham Railway (SECR), which was formed out of the working union between the SER and the LCDR. St Lawrence, closed ostensibly as a war-time measure, never reopened probably because plans to rationalise the lines in Thanet had been in place since the turn of the century. The intervention of the First World War meant that it was left to the Southern Railway to realise the plans.

The remains of St Lawrence station were demolished as part of the works. The works also involved the rebuilding of Newington Road Bridge, originally built in 1846. To the east of the station building stood a signal box for St.Lawrence Junction, the southern junction of the St.Lawrence spur. The northern junction (called Whitehall Junction) also had a signal box, just south of Whitehall Road.

Notes

Sources

Further reading 
 

Disused railway stations in Kent
Former South Eastern Railway (UK) stations
Railway stations in Great Britain opened in 1864
Railway stations in Great Britain closed in 1916
Ramsgate